The College Gridiron Showcase (CGS) is an independently operated annual post-season college football event hosted each January in Fort Worth, Texas.  The event consists of NFL draft prospects who have completed their eligibility in NCAA Division I, NCAA Division II, NCAA Division III, and the NAIA.  CGS also hosts the Pro Gridiron Showcase for non-draft eligible free agents.  The event originated as a post-season all star game in 2015, but switched to its current drill showcase and "controlled scrimmage" format in 2016.

In addition to on-field drills, the event also features educational seminars including those on financial acumen and marketing.

History

2015 
The inaugural CGS event, an All Star Game format was held in Addison, TX.  Of the 104 participants, 10 were selected in the NFL Draft, 53 signed as undrafted free agents, and 22 were rookie camp invitees.  The event also featured the number one overall pick in the 2015 CFL Draft, Alex Mateas.

Notable participants

2016 
The 2016 CGS was held at Pennington Field in Bedford, Texas and was the first that featured the showcase format as opposed to all star game.

Notable participants in the 2016 College Gridiron Showcase include CFL stars Juwan Brescacin, Romar Morris, Eric Temple, Robert Porter, Marvin Hall, Jr., and Reggie Begelton, NFL players Jakeem Grant, Trevor Williams, Jackson Branden, Andrew Adams, and JD McKissic, as well as the XFL's Kenneth Farrow and Jake Shenandoah.

2017 
The 2017 CGS was held at Pennington Field in Bedford, Texas. Lake Erie's Anthony Kukwa was named offensive MVP.  Arkansas State's Chris Odom was the defensive MVP.

Notable participants

2018 
The 2018 College Gridiron Showcase was held at Greenhill School in Addison, TX.

Notable participants

2019 
The 2019 OTA-style format was held January 5–9, 2019 at McNair Stadium in Fort Worth. In addition to the regular showcase and symposium, the 2020 event saw the addition of a "Small School Invitational Showcase" to provide a scouting forum for players from lower tier conferences.

Running back AJ Ouellette from Ohio University and defensive end Kevin Thompson from Bethune-Cookman were named offensive and defensive MVPs, respectively.

Notable participants

2020 
CGS 2020 was held January 3–8 at McNair Stadium in Fort Worth.

Notable participants

References

External links 

 Official Website

College football all-star games
Recurring sporting events established in 2015
NCAA Division I FBS football
NCAA Division II football
NCAA Division III football